Sökespor Kulübü (also Sökespor) is a Turkish sports club from Söke, in the western Turkey.

The clubs plays in red and blue kits, and have done so since their formation in 1970.

Stadium
Currently the team plays at the 6000 capacity Söke Stadyumu.

League participations
TFF First League: 1986–1987, 1989–1994
TFF Second League: ?
TFF Third League: 1984–1986, 1987–1989, 1994–1998
Turkish Regional Amateur League: 1998–

References

External links
Sokespor Logo
Tff.org
Sondakika.com

Football clubs in Turkey
1970 establishments in Turkey
Association football clubs established in 1970